Vadim Olegovych Novoselov (born 16 April 1987) is a Russian male badminton player. He educated at Saratov State University. In 2013, he represented his university became a champion at the European Universities Badminton Championships in men's doubles event. In the same year, he won Israel International tournament with his partner Vladimir Malkov.

Achievements

BWF International Challenge/Series (1 title, 1 runner-up)
Men's Doubles

 BWF International Challenge tournament
 BWF International Series tournament
 BWF Future Series tournament

References

External links
 

1987 births
Living people
Russian male badminton players